Beth Solomon (born October 29, 1952) is an American professional golfer who played on the LPGA Tour.

Solomon won once on the LPGA Tour in 1981.

Professional wins

LPGA Tour wins (1)

LPGA Tour playoff record (1–0)

References

External links
Beth Solomon Legends Tour profile

American female golfers
Furman Paladins women's golfers
LPGA Tour golfers
Golfers from Indiana
People from Henry County, Indiana
1952 births
Living people